Richard Romanowsky (21 April 1883 – 22 July 1968) was an Austrian actor. He appeared in 45 films between 1932 and 1961.

Selected filmography

 Two in a Car (1932)
 Adventure on the Southern Express (1934)
 Farewell Waltz (1934)
 Winter Night's Dream (1935)
 The Valley of Love (1935)
 Make Me Happy (1935)
 The Night With the Emperor (1936)
 Adventure in Warsaw (1937)
 The Charm of La Boheme (1937)
 Not a Word About Love (1937)
 Darling of the Sailors (1937)
 Marionette (1939)
 Beloved Augustin (1940)
 Women Are No Angels (1943)
  Mask in Blue (1943)
 The Singing House (1948)
 Grandstand for General Staff (1953)
 Mask in Blue (1953)
 Season in Salzburg (1952)
 Two Blue Eyes (1955)
 Salzburg Stories (1957)
 Season in Salzburg (1961)

References

External links

1883 births
1968 deaths
Austrian male film actors
20th-century Austrian male actors
Male actors from Vienna